St Leonards TMD is a traction maintenance depot located in Bulverhythe, East Sussex, England. The depot is situated on the East Coastway Line and is on the north side of the line between Bexhill and St Leonards Warrior Square railway stations.

The depot code is SE.

History 
The depot was opened in March 1957 as a DEMU depot. From 1963 to 1967, Class 33 locomotives could be seen at the depot. The depot was electrified in 1986. In 1987, the depot had an allocation of Classes 203, 205, 206 and 207 DEMUs and Class 411 EMUs. By 2010, it was used for servicing Class 377 EMUs.

Present 
As of 2017, the depot is used for stabling of Class 66 diesel locomotives, Class 73 diesel-electric locomotives and Class 171 DMUs.

References

Sources

 Railway depots in England